Radical S-adenosyl methionine domain containing 1 is a protein that in humans is encoded by the RSAD1 gene.

References

Further reading